New Haven Township is the name of some places in the U.S. state of Michigan:

 New Haven Township, Gratiot County, Michigan
 New Haven Township, Shiawassee County, Michigan

See also 
 New Haven, Michigan, a village in Macomb County
 New Haven Township (disambiguation)

Michigan township disambiguation pages